Revivalist may refer to:

 A person involved in language revitalization
 Revivalist (person) involved in a movement of Christian revival
 Revivalism (architecture)
 Revivalist artist, a performer dedicated to reviving a musical or cultural form from an earlier era
 The Revivalists, an American rock band

See also
 Revival (disambiguation)
 Revivalism (disambiguation)
 Revivalistics